Razdolinsk is an urban locality (an urban-type settlement) in Motyginsky District of Krasnoyarsk Krai, Russia. Population:

References

Urban-type settlements in Krasnoyarsk Krai
Motyginsky District